Warlingham School is a large secondary school with pupils aged 11–16, and also has a sixth form for 16- to 18-year-olds. The school is located in the village of Warlingham, in Surrey, England. It is one of three other secondary schools in the district of Tandridge.

The facilities include a sports hall, swimming pool, astroturf, cricket pitches, rugby pitches, a gymnasium and a fitness suite.

Warlingham School is also a Business & Enterprise Specialist School. It helps a number of charities and has a selection of after-school activities, ranging from tennis to tech-crew to LEGO Mindstorm robotics.

The school is part of the Young Chamber Community, which includes students who take part to make a difference to the school's community.

As of 2017, the school has become an academy, partnering with Hamsey Green Primary School, Woodlea Primary School, Tatsfield Primary School and Bletchingley Primary School.

References

Secondary schools in Surrey
Academies in Surrey